Indiana Jones in Revenge of the Ancients is an interactive fiction video game developed by American studio Angelsoft and published by Mindscape in 1987 for the Apple II, Macintosh, and MS-DOS compatible operating systems. The text-only game is based on the Indiana Jones franchise.

Gameplay
Indiana Jones in Revenge of the Ancients is a text adventure game that is not based on any of the films. The eponymous character travels to the Mexican jungle to explore the Tepotzteco Pyramid, with the purpose of getting the Mazatec Power Key before the Nazi forces, under the command of Plebinheim, get to it first.

Reception
In 2008, IGN ranked the game at number nine on its list of "Top 10 Indiana Jones Games", writing, "While not as clever as the Zork series, Revenge of the Ancients tells a good yarn that fits nicely in the Indy oeuvre."

References

External links
 Information at MobyGames
 

1987 video games
Apple II games
DOS games
Revenge of the Ancients
1980s interactive fiction
Interactive fiction based on works
Video game prequels
Interquel video games
Video game sequels
Video games set in Mexico
Video games developed in the United States
Mindscape games